Alexander Young (28 December 1938 – 4 August 1997), better known as George Alexander, was a Scottish singer, songwriter, saxophonist, bassist, guitarist and session musician. He was an elder brother of George Young, the rhythm guitarist and founding member of the Easybeats, as well as Malcolm and Angus Young, founding members of the Australian hard rock band AC/DC, and the younger brother of Stephen Young, the father of Stevie Young, who is also a member of AC/DC.

Background
William Young (born 16 February 1911) and his family lived at 6 Skerryvore Road in the Cranhill district of Glasgow in Scotland. William worked first as a wheel boy in a rope works and then as a machine / saw operator in an asbestos / cement business. William joined the Royal Air Force in 1940, serving in the Second World War as a flight engine mechanic. After the war William worked as a yard man for a builder and then as a postman. His wife Margaret (born 14 July 1913; her maiden name was also Young) was a housewife.

The 'big freeze' of 1963 was the worst winter on record in Scotland with snow eight feet deep. A TV advertisement at the same time offered assisted travel for families for a different life in Australia. 15 members of the Young family left Scotland by aeroplane in late June 1963, including fifth child George (6 November 1946 – 22 October 2017) and younger brothers, Malcolm (6 January 1953 – 18 November 2017) and Angus Young (born 31 March 1955). Also aboard were his eldest brother Stephen (24 June 1933 – 1989), his only sister, Margaret Horsburgh (2 May 1935 – 2019) and brother, William Jr (15 December 1940 – 2011). Another brother, John (1937 - ?) emigrated to Australia later in 1963. Alex chose to remain in Britain to pursue musical interests.

Career
When his family emigrated to Sydney, Young was in a band called the Bobby Patrick Big Six and spent some time in Germany. Later, in 1967, Young formed and played bass in the London-based band Grapefruit, initially called "the Grapefruit", with three former members of Tony Rivers and the Castaways, John Perry, Geoff Swettenham, and Pete Swettenham.

Young was signed as songwriter with Apple Music Publishing Ltd. by Terry Doran, managing director of Apple Publishing, friend of the Beatles, and later manager of Grapefruit, during the summer of 1967. The songwriting contract was based on the strength of the song "Lullaby for a Lazy Day", which John Lennon liked. A tape with this song was found in his personal belongings.

Grapefruit received some support from the Beatles and released two albums and several singles during 1968 and 1969. The group was launched by the Beatles with a press conference on 17 January 1968, their first single being "Dear Delilah". It went to number 21 in the UK singles chart in February 1968. Paul McCartney directed a promo film (never released) for the single "Elevator". McCartney, John Lennon and George Harrison attended and helped in their recording sessions for the singles, as Grapefruit did not have a producer at the time. However, the group broke up in late 1969; only Young and Perry remained in the music business, each as a session musician.

A song written by Alexander Young, "I'm a Rebel", was recorded in September 1976 by his brothers' band AC/DC, but was never released. Young sang lead vocals on the track, with regular AC/DC vocalist Bon Scott on backing vocals. The song was later given to the German group Accept.

In 1971, he released another single, "Sha-Sha"/"Universal Party", under the name Grapefruit with George Young and Harry Vanda.

Alex wrote a song under the name "M James" (his wife's name) called "California" which was recorded by his brother George Young's band "Flash and the Pan" on their debut self-titled album in 1978.

From 1995 until August 1997, Young worked as a music manager with "Proud and Loud Management", based in Hamburg. He died of lung cancer in Hamburg-Sasel on 4 August 1997.

References

External links
An article about Alex Young

1938 births
1997 deaths
Scottish multi-instrumentalists
Scottish rock guitarists
Scottish session musicians
Musicians from Glasgow
Alexander
Deaths from lung cancer in Germany
20th-century Scottish male musicians
People from Cranhill
Marcus Hook Roll Band members